Aleksandr Anatolyevich Shirvindt (born July 19, 1934) is a Soviet and Russian stage and film actor, screenwriter and voice actor. People's Artist of the RSFSR (1989). Since 2000 he has been a theatre director of Moscow Satire Theatre.

Biography 
Aleksandr Shirvindt was born in Moscow in a family of a violinist and music teacher Anatoly Gustavovich Shirvindt (1896–1962) and Raisa Samoilovna Shirvindt (1898–1985) of Moscow Philharmonic Society. Grandfather, Gustav (Gedaliah) Moiseyevich Shirvindt (a graduate of Vilnius 1st Gymnasium in 1881), was a doctor. 

In 1956 Shirvindt graduated from Boris Shchukin Theatre Institute. The same year he made his cinema debut in She Loves You! (1956). 

Shirvindt appeared in more than 40 films, including Grandads-Robbers (1971), The Irony of Fate (1975), The Twelve Chairs (1976), Three Men in a Boat (1979), Station for Two (1982), The Irony of Fate 2 (2007). He voiced Aramis in Dog in Boots film.

Filmography
actor
 Come Tomorrow, Please... (Приходите завтра..., 1963) as Vadim
 Major Whirlwind (Майор "Вихрь", 1967) as Jozef
 Grandads-Robbers (Старики-разбойники, 1971) as spokesman of the minister
 The Irony of Fate (Ирония судьбы, или С лёгким паром!, 1975) as Pavlik
 The Twelve Chairs (Двенадцать стульев, 1976) as one-eyed chess player
 Heavenly Swallows (Небесные ласточки, 1976) as Château-Gibus
 Three Men in a Boat (Трое в лодке, не считая собаки, 1979) as Sir Samuel William Harris
 Incognito from St. Petersburg (Инкогнито из Петербурга, 1977) as district doctor
 Borrowing Matchsticks (1980) as narrator
 Station for Two (Вокзал для двоих, 1982) as Shurik, pianist
 The Circus Princess (Принцесса цирка, 1982) as Firelli, director of the circus
 Simply Awful! (Просто ужас!, 1982) as Chief Physician
 The Most Charming and Attractive (Самая обаятельная и привлекательная, 1985) as Arkady
 Winter Evening in Gagra (Зимний вечер в Гаграх, 1985) as presenter
 Forgotten Melody for a Flute (Забытая мелодия для флейты, 1987) as Myasoedov
 Hello, Fools! (Привет, дуралеи!, 1996) as leader of the Social-Socialist party
 The Irony of Fate 2 (Ирония Судьбы. Продолжение, 2007) as uncle Pasha
 The Return of the Musketeers, or The Treasures of Cardinal Mazarin (Возвращение мушкетёров, или Сокровища кардинала Мазарини, 2009) as Jean-Baptiste Colbert
voice
 The Time Machine (1967) as narrator
 Bayadere (1973) as Storyteller
 Like mushrooms with peas fought (1977) as King Peas
 New Aladdin (Новый Аладдин, 1979) as Aladdin
 Alice in Wonderland (Алиса в Стране чудес, 1981) as Cheshire Cat
 Dog in Boots (Пёс в сапогах, 1981) as Pretty Boy
 The smallest dwarf (1981) as Goat
 There was Saushkin (1981) as uncle Kapa, a resident of Country Dobryakov
 My grandmother and I (2002) as grandson Borya
 Alice in Wonderland (2010) as Cheshire Cat (Russian dub)
Hoffmaniada as Lindhorst / Salamander

Honours and awards
 Order "For Merit to the Fatherland";
1st class (29 May 2019)
2nd class (19 July 2009) – for outstanding contribution to the development of domestic theatrical art and many years of teaching activity
3rd class (21 July 2014)
4th class (2 August 2004) – for outstanding contribution to the development of theatrical art
 Order of Friendship of Peoples (20 June 1994) – for services to the development of theatrical art, and effective pedagogical activity
 Medal "Veteran of Labour" (USSR)
 Honored Artist of the RSFSR (1974)
 People's Artist of the RSFSR (1989)
 Winner of second prize at the Festival of the Arts' Theatre Spring-74 "Laureate of the "Golden Ostap" (1993, for participation in the play "Celebration")
 Chekhov's Medal (2010)
 Badge of Honour "Public Recognition"
 Invited to the jury League of KVN
 In 2003, asteroid 6767 Shirvindt was named in his honor.

References

External links

1934 births
20th-century Russian male actors
21st-century Russian male actors
Living people
Male actors from Moscow
Academicians of the Russian Academy of Cinema Arts and Sciences "Nika"
Honored Artists of the RSFSR
People's Artists of the RSFSR
Full Cavaliers of the Order "For Merit to the Fatherland"
Recipients of the Order of Friendship of Peoples
Jewish Russian actors
Russian male film actors
Russian male stage actors
Russian male voice actors
Russian theatre directors
Soviet male film actors
Soviet male stage actors
Soviet male voice actors
Soviet theatre directors